The currency of the Taiping Heavenly Kingdom consisted of Chinese cash coins and paper money, although the rarity of surviving Taiping paper money suggests that not much was produced. The first cash coins of the Taiping Heavenly Kingdom were issued in the year 1853 in the capital of Tianjing (present day Nanjing). The cash coins of the Taiping Heavenly Kingdom should not be confused with the Taiping Tongbao (太平通寳) which was issued during the Northern Song dynasty between the years 976 and 997, or with any other contemporary rebel coinage that also bear this inscription.

Most cash coins issued by the Taiping Heavenly Kingdom were made from bronze with a smaller quantity being made from either iron or lead. Taiping rebellion cash coins made from either gold or silver are also known to exist but are extremely rare. The reason why the Shengbao tend to be very diverse is because the central government of the Taiping Heavenly Kingdom had allowed local power-holders within their realm to produce their own cash coins within their jurisdiction.

History 

In 1850 the Taiping Rebellion was started by the head of the God worshippers Hong Xiuquan who founded the Taiping Heavenly Kingdom, this rebellion lasted until 1864. Despite its brief existence the Taiping Heavenly Kingdom is known to have cast a number of different cash coins and varieties of them the denominations of all Shengbao notably weren't written down on the cash coins and had to be deduced by weight which made it an inconvenience for the people, some varieties of Shengbao are extremely rare such as a variant of the Taiping Shengbao with the inscription written as "太平聖宝" (using the simplified Chinese character "") instead of the more conventional "太平聖寶". However, as Taiping rebellion era cash coins are very popular with coin collectors there are many fakes. There are also many
"fantasy" cash coins (杜撰), fraudulent "copies" of coins that never actually existed.

Although very little documentation exists about the coinage manufactured by the Taiping rebels, it is known that in June 1853 the occupying Taiping rebels ordered copper workers in Tianjing with the skills to cast coins to open new furnaces for the production of cash coins with the inscription Tianguo Shengbao that were reported to be "the size of foreign coins" (Mexican pesos), these coins were reported to be of very poor workmanship and their production was quickly discontinued and although no coins fitting this description are extant it is known that Taiping rebels in other areas and provinces did cast coinage. The treasury of the Taiping Heavenly Kingdom was initially operated by village pawnbrokers, as was the custom in the rural areas of China at that time.

Cash coins with the inscription Taiping Tianguo (太平天囯) on the obverse and the Chinese characters Shengbao (聖寶) on the reverse are known to have been cast with inscriptions written in "Song period-style script" (方體宋子), regular script (楷書), and Yinqiwen (隱起文), the latter of which refers to a type of Chinese cash coin which de to their manufacturing process have characters that display an unevenness in the height of the strokes of the Hanzi characters which cause some strokes to rise a bit higher than others. Among the rares varieties of Shengbao cash coins include a Tianguo Taiping (天囯太平) cash coin which has its inscription written in "Song period-style script" with the Shengbao (聖寶) characters on the reverse side of the coin written in a vertical position which is referred to as zhí dú (直讀) or a "2 wén-sized" (折二) Tianguo Shengbao (天囯聖寶) cash coin with the characters Taiping (太平) written in a vertical manner on its reverse side.

Among the more common types of Shengbao are three types of cash coins, one was a Taiping Tianguo (太平天囯) written in regular script which had the characters Shengbao (聖寶) on their reverse and were issued in the denominations 1 wén (which were known as "Xiaoping", 小平, and weighed 3 grams), 5 wén (5 grams), 10 wén (8 grams), 50 wén (12 grams), and 100 wén (31 grams). These coins typically have wide rims which were excellently polished and were based on the Xianfeng era coinage produced at the Suzhou mint. The second type of common Shengbao originate from Hengyang, Hunan and are heavier than the first type but generally have a lower amount of copper in their alloy, their inscriptions are written in Song period-style script, have less accurately polished rims, and were issued in denominations of 1 wén, 10 wén, 50 wén, and 100 wén. The third type was also Hunanese in origin and bore the same inscription as the aforementioned coins written in regular script but the words Shengbao (聖寶) were written horizontally from right-to-left around the square center hole on the reverse, the Chinese characters of these cash coins were not protruding from the surface as high as those of the other types of Shengbao. These coins were issued in the denominations of 1 wén, 10 wén, 50 wén, and 100 wén.

List of cash coins issued by the Taiping Heavenly Kingdom 

The following cash coins are known to have been cast by the Taiping Heavenly Kingdom:

Vault protector coins of the Taiping Heavenly Kingdom  
 
 

During the later part of the Taiping Rebellion, the government of the Taiping Heavenly Kingdom cast a small number of vault protector coins with the inscription Taiping Tianguo (太平天囯), these cash coins were notably 7.6 centimeters in diameter and were also very thick. The reverse sides of these vault protector coins contained the characters Shengbao (聖寶, "holy treasure"). In his book "Coins of the Taiping Heavenly Kingdom" (太平天國錢幣), Chinese numismatist Ma Dingxiang (馬定祥) notes that the vault protector coins of the Taiping Heavenly Kingdom were manufactured in Hangzhou, Hunan, and Suzhou. There are only 5 or 6 of Taiping Heavenly Kingdom-made vault protector coins known to exist and these coins all tend to display some very slight differences between them. 

A specimen that was previously in the collection of Ma Dingxiang and sold at auction held in the year 2011 for an amount of $111,286 (RMB 690,000).

Surviving specimens
During the Great Leap Forward, Communist Party chairman Mao Zedong had encouraged every Chinese commune and urban neighbourhood to build their own backyard steel furnaces; this policy was proclaimed in the party's five-year plan in order to further accelerate China's economic and industrial development. In the villages "scrap iron" was to be collected for building these furnaces; this "scrap iron" was often collected from usable iron utensils and other iron tools. In one Chinese village a technician collecting the iron to build the local furnace received a string of between ten and twenty Taiping Heavenly Kingdom iron cash coins to be melted down to make the furnace; the technician thought that destroying these cash coins would be "a waste" and hid them in his pocket and secretly brought them to his house. Later these iron cash coins passed down to his descendants.

See also 

 Qing dynasty coinage

References

Sources 
 

Coins of China 
Cash coins 
Economy of China
Chinese numismatics
Taiping Rebellion